A tethered, moored or captive balloon is a balloon that is restrained by one or more tethers attached to the ground and so it cannot float freely. The base of the tether is wound around the drum of a winch, which may be fixed or mounted on a vehicle, and is used to raise and lower the balloon.

A balloon is a form of aerostat, along with the powered free-flying airship, although the American GAO has used the term "aerostat" to describe a tethered balloon in contrast to the powered airship.

Tethered balloons have been used for advertising, recreation, observation, and civil or military uses.

Design principles

Early balloons were simple round spheres, with a payload hung beneath. The round shape uses the minimum material to accommodate a given volume of lifting gas, making it the lightest construction. However, in any significant wind the round shape is aerodynamically unstable and will bob about, risking damage or the balloon breaking free.

To avoid this problem, the kite balloon was developed. This form has an elongated shape to reduce wind resistance and some form of tail surface to stabilize it so that it always points into the wind. Like the powered airship, such balloons are often called blimps.

A hybrid tethered balloon or kytoon is shaped to provide aerodynamic lift similar to a kite, as well as to reduce drag.

History

Designed by Albert Caquot, a French engineer, in 1914, the barrage balloons of World War I and World War II were early examples of tethered balloons. Military observation balloons were also used extensively in World War I. These early types used hydrogen as their lifting gas.

Tethered balloons are used for lifting cameras, radio antennas, electro-optical sensors, radio-relay equipment and advertising banners – often for long durations. Tethered balloons are also used for position marking and bird control work. Typically, they use non-flammable helium gas to provide lift.

Modern use

Advertising
Tethered balloons are often used for advertising, either by lifting advertisement signs, or by using a balloon with advertisements  written on, or attached to it. Often both methods are combined. It is not uncommon to use specially designed balloons. Blimp-shaped balloons are especially popular for advertising use. By suspending a light source within the envelope, the balloon can be illuminated at night, drawing attention to its message.

Earth sciences
The United States Geological Survey uses tethered balloons to carry equipment to places where conventional aircraft cannot go, such as above an erupting volcano. Tethered balloons are ideal as they can easily remain more or less in one place, are less likely to be damaged by volcanic ash, and are less expensive to operate than a helicopter.

Leisure
Tethered balloons are frequently used as a recreational attraction.

Telecommunications

Tethered balloons can be used as temporary transmitters, instead of a radio mast, either by using the tether which holds the balloon as the antenna, or by carrying antennas on the balloon fed by a fiber optic or radio frequency cable contained inside the tether. The advantage of tethered balloons is that great antenna heights are easily attainable and they are significantly cheaper than erecting a temporary mast.

Tethered balloons or blimps have been studied to overcome the limitations of terrestrial cell towers for telecommunications. Because of their higher elevation they can provide a larger coverage area and better line of sight, would be more economical and would have better latency than satellite systems.

Security and defense

During the 1990 Invasion of Kuwait, the first indication of the Iraqi ground advance was from a radar-equipped tethered balloon that detected Iraqi armor and air assets moving south. Tethered surveillance balloons were used in the 2004 American occupation of Iraq. They utilized a high-tech optics system to detect and observe enemies from miles away. They have been used to over watch foot patrols and convoys in Baghdad, Afghanistan, and are permanently installed above US military bases in Kabul and Bagram.

The US Drug Enforcement Administration has contracted with Lockheed Martin to operate a series of radar-equipped tethered balloons to detect low-flying aircraft attempting to enter the United States.

The U.S. Army has developed a tethered aerostat to perform operational testing at Aberdeen Proving Ground beginning in 2015.  The system, called JLENS, uses two moored balloons designed to provide over-the-horizon missile defense capability.

See also

 Aerostatics
 Barrage balloons
 Aerophile SA
 Raven Aerostar
 Worldwide Aeros Corp

References

Aircraft configurations
Balloons (aeronautics)